Jazbine is a dispersed settlement in the Municipality of Gorenja Vas–Poljane in the Upper Carniola region of Slovenia.

Church

The local church, built below the peak called Malenski vrh (literally, 'Mill Peak', from maln 'mill'), also serves the settlement of Malenski Vrh and is dedicated to the Assumption of Mary. It was built between 1703 and 1705 on the site of an earlier church. The main altar dates to 1717.

Notable people
Notable people that were born or lived in Jazbine include:
Tone Demšar (1902–1942), Partisan and commandant of the Škofja Loka Company

References

External links 

Jazbine on Geopedia

Populated places in the Municipality of Gorenja vas-Poljane